Saraswathi Institute of Medical Sciences is a private medical college located at Anawarpur, near Pilakhuwa in Hapur district, Uttar Pradesh, India. It was established in 2008.

Controversies 
In April 2022, an MBBS girl student filed an FIR against five students alleging to be brutally thrashed and dragged with hair after she opposed ragging.

External Links

 Official website

References

Private medical colleges in India
Medical colleges in Uttar Pradesh
Hapur district
2008 establishments in Uttar Pradesh
Educational institutions established in 2008